António Morato may refer to:
António Morato (footballer, born 1937), Portuguese footballer
António Morato (footballer, born 1964), Portuguese footballer